Collège Jean de la Mennais is a French private mixed secondary school on the South Shore of Montreal, Québec, Canada  at 870 Chemin de Saint-Jean in the  municipality of La Prairie. As of 2007, the school had about 1750 elementary and high school students. Collège Jean de la Mennais was once directed by religious brothers, although today it is directed by a secular administration. The faculty is mixed between secular and religious personnel. On the school grounds there is a private cemetery which holds the graves of brothers connected to the school.

History
The institution was officially founded by the Brothers of Christian Instruction in 1890, an international Christian educational organization founded in 1819 in France by two priests: Gabriel Deshayes and Jean-Marie de la Mennais for the instruction of youth that has education institutions all over the world. The school was named Jean de la Mennais in 1972 in honor of Jean-Marie Robert de la Mennais, co-founder of the Brothers of Christian Instruction. Other schools in many other countries including France and Japan have the same or very similar name to Jean de la Mennais. Although it only had high school beforehand, elementary grades 5 and 6 were introduced in 1999.

Today

Environment
The school is very well equipped and modern with recent computer labs, new science labs, a freshly renovated cafeteria, big classrooms, a dance studio, two sport complexes with a pool and three gyms including one synthetic grass gym for indoor soccer and golf.
The school has earned popularity over the years in Montreal and Quebec with its high rankings in the L'actualité/Fraser Institute annual Québec high school ranking report. By calculating the average score of the school from 2002 to 2007, it is ranked second best school in the province with a score of 9.9 right behind Collège Jean-de-Brébeuf and Collège Jean-Eudes both with scores of 10.0. As of 2007's report, Jean de la Mennais has a mark of 9.9 which makes it the fourth highest ranked high school out of more than 400 in the province and the best high school on the South Shore of Montreal for many years in a row. Jean de la Mennais is often regarded as one of the most prestigious secondary institutions on the South Shore of Montreal.

Admission
Unlike many other top private schools in Québec, Jean de la Mennais doesn't necessarily take the best candidates for admission. Since one of the main goal of the Brothers of Christian Instruction is to let education be available to everyone and especially to the working class, the school admits students more randomly. All candidates are asked to pass an admission exam, this exam is to eliminate inadequate candidates whose academic capacities don't meet the school requirements. Some of those who pass will be admitted on the application order basis, those who applied first during a certain time frame or who have or had parents/siblings at school are admitted first. The other ones will be admitted following an electronic draw.

Programs
The school offers two main secondary programs: the regular and the enriched curricula. These two programs have the exact courses from secondary one to four with the exception of Spanish as an enriched topic for the enriched section at the expense of one or two periods of French or Mathematics for every 8-day schedule. The enriched program is changed into an advanced science program in the last year with mathematics 536, physics, chemistry and advanced science topics as an extra course. In their senior year (secondary 5), students can choose optional courses to match with their interest: journalism, psychology, advanced mathematics, physics, chemistry, law, theatre, history, enriched science topics etc. The school offers three levels of English: English as a second language (basic level), Enriched English as a second language (enriched) and English language arts (for native or very advanced speakers).

Notable alumni
Nicolas Girard, Member of parliament, political figure.
Stéphane Gendron, Economist and political figure current mayor of Huntingdon, Quebec and political analyst for several media outlets
Pierre Langlois, Economist and political figure
Denise Ho, Hong Kong singer/actress
Simon Tian, Canadian businessman

External links
Brothers of Christian Instruction
Official Website (French)
Alumni Website (French)

Private schools in Quebec
Educational institutions established in 1890
La Prairie, Quebec
High schools in Montérégie
1890 establishments in Canada